The Weird World of Blow Fly is the debut album by Clarence Reid as his alter ego Blowfly. It was released in 1973 on the Weird World Records label, a subsidiary of T.K. Records. The album features sexually explicit spoofs of soul and R&B hits, mostly from the 1960s and 1970s.

Reception

AllMusic awarded the album 4 stars with its review by Stewart Mason stating, "Some will undoubtedly find the whole enterprise juvenile and distasteful, and frankly, a couple of the parodies are a little too obvious to be clever..., but most of the album is really very funny, for those who like this sort of thing".

Track listing

Personnel 
 Blowfly  - Vocals, producer
 Benny Latimore - Keyboards 
 George "Chocolate" Perry - Bass
 Jerome Smith - Guitar
 Little Beaver - Guitar
 Mike Lewis Orchestra - Strings, horns
 Rich Finch - Bass
 Robert Ferguson - Drums
 Timmy Thomas - Keyboards
 Wildfire - Backing vocals
 Freddy Stonewall - Engineer

References

External links
Discogs
Henry Stone Official Website

1973 debut albums
Blowfly (musician) albums